"' Charles Deslondes'" ( – January 11, 1811) was an African American revolutionary who was one of the leaders in the 1811 German Coast uprising, a slave revolt that began on January 8, 1811, in the Territory of Orleans. He led more than 200 rebels against the plantations along the Mississippi River toward New Orleans. White planters formed militias and ended up hunting down the rebels.

The enslaved insurgents killed one Free Man of Color, the "commandant", "overseer", or "slave driver" on the Andry Plantation which started the revolt, and one white man during their retreat from the outskirts of New Orleans. The militia and the Army killed 95 enslaved people, reflecting killings in the battle on Bernard Bernoudy's plantation, some gratuitous "accidental" killings of innocent enslaved people by the Army on its march from New Orleans, and the executions which followed the tribunals after the revolt was put down.

Early life 
Charles Deslondes was born on the plantation of Jacques Deslondes about the year 1789. Deslandes's plantation succession records have Charles described as being a "Creole mulatto slave" by the name of Charles, "about 16 years old", listed as a "field laborer." He was likely baptized a Catholic.

It is disputed whether Jacques Deslondes brought Charles over from Saint-Domingue; there is no record of Jacques ever having lived in Saint Domingue, and there is no record of Jacques buying Charles before Deslondes died in 1793. Deslondes had a continually documented presence in Louisiana from the time he was 17 years old until he died in 1793.

Charles Deslondes worked as a "driver," or overseer of enslaved people, on the plantation of Col. Manuel Andre (or Andry), who enslaved 86 people. This plantation was later renamed the Woodland Plantation.

The revolt

Deslondes had organized slaves and maroons for revolt in what is now St. John the Baptist Parish, part of the German Coast (of the Mississippi River) because it had been settled by many German immigrants in the 1720s, long before the cultivation of sugar cane in the area. Deslondes's forces recruited other enslaved people from plantations along the way southeast into St. Charles Parish before turning back shortly before encountering militia sent from New Orleans. Accounts of the number of insurgents vary, from 200 to 500 men. The men killed two whites near the beginning of their march and burned down three plantation houses and some crops. They fought primarily with cane knives and captured a limited number of weapons, although they had planned on more.

On January 11, a planter militia led by Col. Manuel Andry attacked the main body of insurgents at the back of Bernard Bernoudy's plantation west of New Orleans. Andry and his overseer, a free man of color named "Petit" Baptiste Thomassin, had been the first targets of the insurrection. Mr. Thomassin discovered the rebels who killed him, attacked Manuel Andry, and seriously wounded him with an ax. Many articles stated that the younger Andry had also been killed. This is entirely false. The "younger Andry", Gilbert Andry, died on January 2 and was buried on January 3, five days before the start of the revolt.  Gilbert was married to the daughter of Jacques Deslondes, Marie Marcelline Deslondes. The militia killed about forty enslaved people in the battle, from which many enslaved people fled into the swamps. Shortly afterward, the militia killed fourteen more enslaved people in other skirmishes and captured many more, although as many as 100 may have escaped permanently. After interrogating the captives, they quickly tried and executed eighteen enslaved people at the Destrehan plantation. They tried and executed eleven enslaved people in New Orleans. A total of ninety-five insurgents were killed in the aftermath of the rebellion.

Death 
Deslondes was among the first captured by dogs after the battle. The militia did not hold him for trial or interrogation. Samuel Hambleton described Deslonde's fate: "Charles [Deslondes] had his hands chopped off then shot in one thigh & then the other, until they were both broken – then shot in the body and before he had expired was put into a bundle of straw and roasted!"  His dying cries sent a message to the other escaped enslaved people in the marshes.

Legacy 
In 2021 on the site, the 1811 Kid Ory Historic House opened, dedicated both to the German Coast uprising and to Kid Ory, American jazz composer, trombonist, and bandleader, who was born there in 1886.) In a letter printed in the Philadelphia "Political and Commercial Advertiser" on February 19 that year, Deslondes was mistakenly described as a free person of color.

Citations

Further reading
Dormon, James H., "The Persistent Specter: Slave Rebellion in Territorial Louisiana." "Louisiana History" 28 (Fall 1977): 389–404.
Paquette, Robert L., "Revolutionary St. Domingue in the Making of Territorial Louisiana", in "A Turbulent Time: The French Revolution in the Greater Caribbean" (Bloomington, Indiana: Indiana University Press, 1997), pp. 218–20. 
Rasmussen, Daniel, "American Uprising: The Untold Story of America's Largest Slave Revolt" Harper/HarperCollins Publishers. 
Rodriguez, Junius P. "'Always En Garde': The Effects of Slave Insurrection upon the Louisiana Mentality", "Louisiana History" 33 (Fall 1992): 399–416.
Thompson, Thomas Marshall. "National Newspaper and Legislative Reactions to Louisiana's Deslonde Slave Revolt of 1811", "Louisiana History" 33 (Winter 1992): 5–29.

1780s births
1811 deaths
Year of birth uncertain
American rebel slaves
Conflicts in 1811
History of slavery in Louisiana
People executed by burning
19th-century American slaves